Walton Alfonso Webson is an Antiguan diplomat. He has served as the Permanent Representative to the United Nations in New York of Antigua and Barbuda since 2014. He is President of the UNICEF Executive Board at the international level in 2017.

He holds a Bachelor of Science degree and a Master of Science in management of non-profit organizations from The New School for Social Research and a PhD in management from Case Western Reserve University. He worked for Perkins International from 1992 to 2014, and was the organization's Director from 2011.

References

Year of birth missing (living people)
Living people
Antigua and Barbuda diplomats
Chairmen and Presidents of UNICEF
Antigua and Barbuda officials of the United Nations
Permanent Representatives of Antigua and Barbuda to the United Nations
The New School alumni
Case Western Reserve University alumni